The 1996 Copa dos Campeões Mundiais was the second edition of the Copa dos Campeões Mundiais. São Paulo FC has won their second title.

Participants

First stage

Standings

Final

Champion

References

External links 

1996 in Brazilian football
Copa dos Campeões Mundiais